The All Saints Church is a Roman Catholic church in Livno, Bosnia and Herzegovina.

References 

Roman Catholic churches in Livno
Livno
Roman Catholic churches completed in 1899
19th-century Roman Catholic church buildings in Bosnia and Herzegovina